is a Japanese politician and former governor of Shimane Prefecture in Japan, elected from 2007 to 2019. He is a graduate of the University of Tokyo and former official of the Ministry of Finance.

References
 

University of Tokyo alumni
People from Shimane Prefecture
1946 births
Living people
Governors of Shimane Prefecture